François Debré (3 April 1942 – 14 September 2020) was a French writer and journalist. Winner of the Albert Londres Prize in 1977, he was a member of the Société des gens de lettres.

Biography
The second son of Prime Minister Michel Debré and his wife, Anne-Marie Lemaresquier, François was also the brother of Vincent, Jean-Louis, and Bernard. Additionally, he was the grandson of Robert Debré and the nephew of Olivier Debré.

After studying law and eastern languages, he joined the magazine Afrique contemporaine in 1966 before becoming a freelance journalist in 1968. Between 1968 and 1977, he covered numerous conflicts around the world. He worked in Biafra for Le Monde, and in Cambodia and Vietnam for L'Obs and Le Point. In 1968, he won the Prix de la critique indépendante for his essay on the Nigerian Civil War.

Debré was regarded as one of the most talented reporters of his generation. In the early 1970s, he worked numerous reports for TF1, Antenne 2, and France Régions 3 in Chad, Ivory Coast, Uganda, and Pakistan. He joined TF1's foreign policy service in 1977. He was a major reporter for the channel until 1985. He covered several major events, such as the Yom Kippur War, the start of Solidarity in Poland, and the dismissal of Jean-Bédel Bokassa in the Central African Republic.

In 1977, he won the Prix Albert-Londres for his essay on the Khmer Rouge, titled Cambodge, la révolution de la forêt.  He returned from South-East Asia with an opiate addiction. In 1988, he directed magazines for Antenne 2, where he was appointed deputy editor-in-chief. On 16 December 2011, Debré was given a two-month suspended sentence for his involvement in Jacques Chirac's scheme to raise money for his presidential run while serving as Mayor of Paris.

Debré was married to Maylis Ybarnegaray, daughter of Jean Ybarnégaray, with whom he had two daughters: the novelist Constance Debré and the journalist at Le Monde Ondine. He died following a long illness in Montlouis-sur-Loire on 14 September 2020 at the age of 78, one day after the death of his brother, Bernard.

Works

Feature films
Éthiopie, les dernières années du Negus
Le Petit Livre rouge
Les Chinois de la diaspora
La Remontée du Mekong
Les Trottoirs de Manille
La Quadrature des cercles
Les Narcotiques anonymes

Screenwriting
L'Amiral aux pieds nus
La Ballade de Menardeau
L'Homme de pouvoir
Possession vaut titre

Publications
La Vingt-et-unième Chinoise (1968)
Biafra an II (1968)
Premier crime (1975)
Les Chinois de la diaspora (1976)
Cambodge, la révolution de la forêt (1977)
Le Livre des égarés (1979)
Les Fêtes d'automne (1983)
Trente ans avec sursis (1998)
Le Livre des Égarés (2019)

Awards
Prix de la critique indépendante for Biafra an II (1968)
Prix Albert-Londres for Cambodge, la révolution de la forêt (1977)
Grand prix du festival international de Monte-Carlo for Les Trottoirs de Manille (1981)

References

1942 births
2020 deaths
20th-century French journalists
20th-century French male writers
20th-century French screenwriters
21st-century French non-fiction writers
21st-century French male writers
French male journalists
French male screenwriters
French people of Jewish descent
Writers from Toulouse